Saanand Verma is an Indian film and television actor. He has appeared in a number of serials, movies, web series as well as advertising films. He is currently playing the role of "Anokhelal Saxena" in &TV sitcom Bhabi Ji Ghar Par Hain.

Filmography

Films

Television

Web series

References

External links
 
 

1972 births
Living people
People from Bihar
Indian male film actors